Candelariella aurella, the hidden goldspeck lichen or eggyolk lichen, is a yellow crustose lichen in the family Candelariaceae. It is commonly found on calcareous rock or wood or bark exposed to sunlight and which may have calcareous dust in areas with lime soils. 
The thallus is areolate with scattered small (0.1–0.3 mm), rounded to elongated yellow areolas. It has a global distribution and occurs on limestone and calcareous sandstone in the Sonoran Desert in Arizona, California, and Baja California. It occurs in Joshua Tree National Monument.

Phoma candelariellae is a species of lichenicolous (lichen-eating) fungus that has been documented parasitisising the apothecia of Candelariella aurella individuals in Europe. Infection by the fungus results in reduced ascospore production, and eventual destruction of the hymenium of the affected apothecia.

References

aurella
Lichen species
Lichens described in 1796
Lichens of Europe
Lichens of North America
Taxa named by Georg Franz Hoffmann